Banksia tricuspis, commonly known as Lesueur banksia or pine banksia, is a plant in the family Proteaceae and is endemic to a small area in the south-west of Western Australia. It is a stunted tree or shrub with narrow leaves and cylindrical spikes of golden-coloured flowers and it occurs in a geographic range of just 15 square kilometres near Jurien.

Description
New growth is produced in spring and is pale greenish-brown. The upper surface of the leaves is covered with soft hairs at first but becomes glabrous as the leaves mature. The lower surface is woolly.

As with many other members of the genus, inflorescences or flower spikes may contain hundreds or thousands of individual flowers, each of which consists of a tube-shaped perianth made up of four joined tepals, and one long wiry style. Flowering occurs from late March to July. Only up to 35 of the flowers on a spike will form seeds and these are contained in large, woody fruit called follicles. The fruit remain closed until the plant is heated during a fire, after which one or two winged seeds are released from each follicle.

Taxonomy and naming
Banksia tricuspis was first formally described by Carl Meissner in 1855 from specimens collected by James Drummond and the description was published in Hooker's Journal of Botany and Kew Garden Miscellany. The specific epithet (tricuspis) is a Latin word meaning "having three points", referring to the three teeth on the leaf tips.

This species is placed alone in series Banksia ser. Tricuspidae.

Distribution and habitat
This banksia only occurs around Mount Lesueur in Lesueur National Park in the Geraldton Sandplains biogeographic region. It grows in rocky lateritic soil in shrubland.

Ecology
This plant is fire tolerant and new growth sprouts from epicormic buds after fire. There is evidence that black cockatoos (genus Calyptorhynchus) increase the rate of seed set by selectively destroying borers.

Conservation
Banksia tricuspis is classified as "Priority Four" by the Government of Western Australia Department of Parks and Wildlife, meaning that is rare or near threatened.

Use in horticulture
This is a slow-growing plant and may take 10 years to flower for the first time. The foliage is sparse except for at the branch tips and the flower spikes and old fruit are attractive. It grows best in sandy or rocky soil in a sunny location. Seeds do not require any treatment, and take 18 to 57 days to germinate.

References

External links

tricuspis
Endemic flora of Western Australia
Eudicots of Western Australia
Rosids of Western Australia
Plants described in 1855
Taxa named by Carl Meissner